Elsa Albertina Regnell (later Holmberg, 29 May 1889 – 1 January 1967) was a Swedish diver. She competed in the 1912 Summer Olympics and finished fourth in the 10 m platform competition, behind her elder sister Lisa. Their brother Nils was an Olympic swimmer.

References

1889 births
1967 deaths
Swedish female divers
Olympic divers of Sweden
Divers at the 1912 Summer Olympics
Stockholms KK divers
Divers from Stockholm
19th-century Swedish women
20th-century Swedish women